14th Central Committee may refer to:
Central Committee of the 14th Congress of the All-Union Communist Party (Bolsheviks), 1925–1927
14th Central Committee of the Chinese Communist Party, 1992–1997
14th Central Committee of the Romanian Communist Party, 1989